Gypo may refer to:

 Gypo (film), a 2005 British independent film from Jan Dunn
 Gypo Nolan, title character of The Informer (novel) and the 1935 film adaptation
 derogatory name for Romani people derived from Gypsy
 nickname of Terry Hurlock (born 1958), English former footballer